Kurz is a surname. It most commonly refers to Sebastian Kurz (born 1986), a former Austrian politician who twice served as chancellor of Austria.

Other notable people with the surname include:

 Heinz D. Kurz (born 1946), Austrian economics professor
 Hermann Kurz (1813–1873), German poet and novelist
 Isolde Kurz (1853–1944), German poet and short story writer, daughter of Hermann Kurz
 Marco Kurz (born 1969), German footballer and manager
 Rob Kurz (born 1985), American basketball player
 Robert Kurz (philosopher) (1943–2012), German philosopher and publicist
 Selma Kurz (1874–1933), Austrian operatic soprano
 Siegfried Kurz (1930–2023), German composer, conductor and academic teacher
 Toni Kurz (1913–1936), German mountaineer
 Vilém Kurz (1872–1945), Czech pianist and piano teacher
 Wilhelm Adolfovich Kurz (1892–1938), Austrian-born Soviet official
 Wilhelm Sulpiz Kurz (1834–1878), German botanist

See also 
 First Kurz government
 Second Kurz government
 Curtius (disambiguation)
 Walther PP Kurz, a firearm
 Kurtz (disambiguation)
 K band (IEEE), "Kurz band"

German-language surnames
Surnames from nicknames